Al-Hilal Sports Cultural & Social Club also known as Al-Hilal Benghazi is a Libyan professional association football club based in Benghazi, Libya that competes in the Libyan Premier League.

The club has witnessed huge development milestones at the level of infrastructure, strategic development plans and marketing under the leadership of the new board of directors (Nader Bushnaf) and the Sports Director Hossamedin Bedier.

Bedier joined Al Hilal SC, as one of the biggest clubs in Libya. and became the youngest Director of Sports Development in Africa. This role was also in the difficult postwar context of the country.

Honours
Libyan Premier League
Runners-up (2): 1964–65, 2000

Libyan Cup
Winners (1): 2000–02
Runners-up (4): 1976–77, 1997–98, 2003–04, 2016-17, 2017-18

Performance in CAF competitions
CAF Cup Winners' Cup: 2 appearances
2001 – First Round
2003 – Second Round

Current players
(in alphabetical order)
 Faisal Albadry
 Moaaz Alammamy
 Hossam Anbieh

References

External links
Team profile – Soccerway.com
Official Facebook Page 

 
Hilal
Association football clubs established in 1952
1952 establishments in Libya
Sport in Benghazi